Corbière may refer to:

Places
 La Corbière, Jersey, Channel Islands
 La Corbière, Haute-Saône, France

Other
 Corbiere (horse), a racehorse who won the Grand National in 1983

People with the surname
 Édouard Corbière (1793–1875), French sailor, shipowner, journalist and writer
 Jacques-Joseph Corbière (1766–1853), French interior minister
 Jeannette Corbiere Lavell (born 1942), Canadian women's rights activist
 Louis Corbière (1850–1941), French botanist and mycologist
 Roger de la Corbière (1893–1974), French painter
 Tristan Corbière (1845–1875), French poet

See also 
 Corbières (disambiguation)